Micranthocereus is genus of cactus. It originates from Brazil and includes about 11 species.

The two genera Austrocephalocereus Backeb. and Siccobaccatus P.J.Braun &  have been brought into synonymy with this genus.

Species
, Plants of the World Online accepted the following species:

References

External links

 
Cactoideae genera